Iniistius twistii, the redblotch razorfish, is a species of marine ray-finned fish from the family Labridae, the wrasses. It is found in the Western Pacific Ocean.
  

Etymology
The fish is named in honor of Albertus Jacobus Duymaer van Twist (1809–1887), the Governor-General of the Dutch East Indies. He ruled for five years
from 1851 to 1856.

References

twistii
Taxa named by Pieter Bleeker
Fish described in 1856